Abdul Mannan Howlader (died 6 October 2015) was a Bangladesh Awami League politician and the former Member of Parliament of Barisal-5.

Career
Howlader was elected to parliament from Barisal-5 as a Bangladesh Awami League candidate in 1973.

Death
Howlader died on 6 October 2015 in Sher-e-Bangla Medical College, Barisal, Bangladesh.

References

Awami League politicians
2015 deaths
1st Jatiya Sangsad members